Moise Fokou ( "Moses"; born August 28, 1985) is a former Cameroon-born American football linebacker who played six seasons in the National Football League (NFL). He was drafted by the Philadelphia Eagles in the seventh round of the 2009 NFL Draft. He played college football at Maryland and Frostburg State.

Fokou has also played for the Indianapolis Colts, Tennessee Titans, and New Orleans Saints.

Early years
Fokou was born in Cameroon to parents Jean-Marie and Louise Takougne. In 1990, his parents moved to Rockville, Maryland. His brother, Achille Kolla, played as a defensive back for Catholic University. Fokou attended Westland Middle School in Bethesda, Maryland, the Bethesda-Chevy Chase High School in Bethesda, Maryland and Bullis School in Potomac, Maryland, where he played football as a running back and linebacker. There, during his senior year in 2003, he was named an All-IAC and Washington Post second-team All-Met player. He was also named the conference most valuable player. In 2008, Fokou took the citizenship test after three years on the waiting list.

College career
In 2004, Fokou attended Frostburg State University. On the football team, he saw action in all ten games and recorded the second-most tackles on the team with 70. He had 5.5 tackles for loss, 1.5 sacks, and blocked two kicks.

In 2005, Fokou transferred to the University of Maryland, where he was required by NCAA rules to sit out for one season. He was twice named the scout team defensive player of the week prior to the games against Virginia and Boston College. In 2006, he played in all 13 games as a reserve "Will" linebacker behind Erin Henderson and in a role on special teams. He recorded 21 tackles and tied for fifth in the Atlantic Coast Conference (ACC) in forced fumbles with 0.18 per game. In 2007, Fokou started all 13 games at the "Sam" linebacker position. He ranked third on the team with 84 tackles including 7.0 for loss. Fokou also forced one fumble and recorded one interception.

In 2008, he saw action in all 13 games, including 12 starts, as a Sam linebacker. He recorded 77 total tackles, including 41 solo and 12.0 for loss, five sacks, two passes broken up, and one quarterback hurry. Fokou led the team in sacks and ranked fifth in total tackles. He accounted for the most sacks by a Maryland linebacker since Shawne Merriman in 2004.

Fokou played in the 2009 Under Armour Senior Bowl as a member of the South squad.

Professional career

Pre-draft
He also participated in the 2009 NFL Combine. The NFL Draft Scout assessed him as the 30th-ranked outside linebacker prospects for the 2009 NFL Draft.

Philadelphia Eagles
Fokou was selected in the seventh round by the Philadelphia Eagles as the 230th overall pick in the 2009 NFL Draft. He played all 16 games and won the starting strong-side linebacker job for the final four games. He ended the season with 39 tackles.

After starting for most of the season at strong-side linebacker in 2011, Fokou was placed on injured reserve on November 29 due to a sprained ankle suffered during a week 12 loss to the New England Patriots.

Indianapolis Colts
On August 2, 2012, Fokou and Greg Lloyd were traded to the Indianapolis Colts for Kevin Thomas and a conditional seventh round pick in the 2013 NFL Draft.

Tennessee Titans
Fokou signed with the Tennessee Titans on March 13, 2013. He was released on August 30, 2014.

New Orleans Saints
On November 18, 2014, Fokou was signed by the New Orleans Saints.

Cleveland Browns
On August 10, 2015, Fokou was signed by the Cleveland Browns. On August 31, 2015, he was released by the Browns.

References

External links

Maryland Terrapins bio
Indianapolis Colts bio
Tennessee Titans bio
Fokou passing camp tests, Rivals.com, August 16, 2008.
Terp tries for hold, The Washington Times, August 15, 2008.

1985 births
Living people
Cameroonian players of American football
Sportspeople from Rockville, Maryland
Players of American football from Maryland
American football linebackers
Maryland Terrapins football players
Frostburg State Bobcats football players
Philadelphia Eagles players
Indianapolis Colts players
Tennessee Titans players
New Orleans Saints players
Cleveland Browns players
Bethesda-Chevy Chase High School alumni